The 2010 Solihull Metropolitan Borough Council election took place on 6 May 2010 to elect members of Solihull Metropolitan Borough Council in the West Midlands, England. One third of the council was up for election and the council stayed under no overall control.

Campaign
Before the election the council was run by the Conservatives, but without an overall majority after Castle Bromwich
councillor, Ian Hillas, had defected to independent in 2009. 2 sitting councillors stood down at the election, Liberal Democrat Bob Reeves from Lyndon ward and the British National Party's George Morgan from Chelmsley Wood ward. 17 seats were contested in the election with candidates from the Conservative party, Liberal Democrats, Labour Party, Green Party and British National Party.

There was also a new party contesting 15 of the 17 seats, the Solihull and Meriden Residents' Association. This was formed by a number of independents in response to a council tax rise of 2.5% and to address what they saw as a loss of democracy in local council politics. Among the candidates for the Solihull and Meriden Residents' Association was Trevor Eames a former Independent Ratepayer councillor for 18 years, who had resigned from the council after being jailed for 7 years, but who said he wanted to serve as councillor as "recompense". The only independent candidate Neil Watts was on the ballot paper and described in the press as an independent, but was endorsed as a candidate for the Solihull and Meridan Residents Association.

The Solihull and Meriden Residents' Association wanted to have local referendums, reduce councillors pay and have local council officers deal with graffiti and flytipping. Other issues in the election included the removal of maternity services from Solihull, preserving green space and the future of Jaguar Land Rover.

Election result
The results saw no party win a majority on the council after the Conservatives lost 2 seats to have 23 councillors. The Liberal Democrats had 19 seats after gaining Elmdon from the Conservatives defeating cabinet member Ken Hawkins by 128 votes. Labour gained Kingshurst and Fordbridge ward from the Conservatives by 110 votes and also took Chelmsley Wood from the British National Party finishing ahead of the Green Party candidate by just 22 votes. Chelmsley Wood had been the British National Party's only seat, while the results meant Labour held 7 seats after the election. The Solihull and Meriden Residents' Association failed to win any seats, with their most high-profile candidate Trevor Eames coming third in Shirley South.

Following the election the Liberal Democrat and Labour parties formed a coalition to run the council, with Liberal Democrat Ian Hedley being elected leader of the council with 26 of the 51 votes on 25 May.

This result had the following consequences for the total number of seats on the council after the elections :

Ward results

By-elections between 2010 and 2011

References

2010 English local elections
May 2010 events in the United Kingdom
2010
2010s in the West Midlands (county)